USS Segundo (SS-398) was a , of the United States Navy named for the segundo, a cavalla fish of Caribbean waters.

Construction and commissioning
Segundo was laid down on 14 October 1943 by the Portsmouth Navy Yard in [Kittery, Maine, launched on 5 February 1944, sponsored by Mrs. John L. Sullivan, and commissioned on 9 May 1944.

May–August 1944
Segundo completed fitting out and contract trials then moved to New London, Connecticut, on 15 June and began training.  The submarine stood out of New London on 26 June for the Panama Canal Zone en route to the Pacific war zone. She departed Balboa on 9 July and arrived at Pearl Harbor on 25 July. The next several weeks were spent in training exercises and weapons firing. The ship was combat loaded on 19 August and 20 August and, the next day, sailed on her first war patrol.

First and second patrols, August 1944 – January 1945 
Segundo, together with submarines , and  formed a wolf pack. They refueled at Saipan on 3 September and departed the next day for their patrol area in the Philippines near Surigao Strait. No rounds struck her. Segundo found no worthwhile targets were found during the patrol, and she ended it at Majuro Atoll in the Marshall Islands on 21 October 1944 without having fired a shot.

The second patrol, from 16 November 1944 to 5 January 1945, was more profitable. On the evening of 6 December, a convoy of seven escorted merchant ships was sighted. The three submarines made night attacks which sank all of the merchantmen.

Third patrol, February–March 1945 
Three torpedo attacks were made on unescorted ships near the Korean coast in shallow water. The first attack was on 6 March against a small ship but all torpedoes missed. The next was made four days later against a medium-sized ship. Four torpedoes were fired at  but they also missed.

The third attack was a night surface action against a cargo ship on 11 March. Two torpedoes of the spread hit. The first blew the stern off and the second hit amidships, sinking cargo ship Shori Maru in two minutes. The submarine ended her patrol at Pearl Harbor on 26 March and remained there for a month before putting to sea again.

Fourth and fifth patrols, May–August 1945 
Segundo was assigned to a lifeguard station until 16 May when she departed for her assigned area in the East China Sea. On 29 May, she sank seven two-masted schooners of approximately 100 tons each with shellfire. Two days later, she sank a large four-masted full-rigged ship of approximately 1,250 tons with two torpedoes. She sank another on 3 June with her deck gun. On 9 June, two patrol ships were also sunk by her deck gun. On the night of 11 June, Fukui Maru was torpedoed and sunk. The submarine then sailed to Midway Atoll for upkeep.

Segundo began her fifth and final war patrol on 10 August in the Sea of Okhotsk. The enemy boat was ordered to halt by international signal. This was done; and, after several trips between the two submarines by their respective representatives, the Japanese agreed to accept a prize crew aboard and to proceed to Tokyo with Segundo. The two ships entered Sagami Wan on 31 August and, at 05:00, the American flag was raised aboard I-401.

1945–1953 
Segundo stood out of Tokyo Bay on 3 September 1945 en route to the west coast via Pearl Harbor. She was assigned to SubRon 3 in San Diego and began operations from there. The submarine made a three-month cruise to Australia and China in 1946 and a four-month cruise to China in 1948. The outbreak of the Korean War found Segundo in the Far East. She supported United Nations Forces in Korea from July to September 1950 before returning to San Diego in late November.

In 1951, Segundo was modernized and converted to a Fleet Snorkel submarine at the San Francisco Naval Shipyard. She returned to her home port and resumed operations until 15 August 1952 when she again joined the 7th Fleet off Korea. That deployment period ended on 16 February 1953.

1953–1970 
For the next 16 years, Segundo operated out of her home port and along the west coast. From 1953 through 1969, she was deployed to the western Pacific every year except  1961, and 1963.

Segundo departed for the Western Pacific Ocean on 27 November 1956 with stops in Pearl Harbor, Yokosuka, Japan, Hong Kong, China, Subic Bay and Manila, Philippines and Buckner Bay, Okinawa.
The reason for this emergency departure was because of the Hungarian revolt that was taking place at the time. The Segundo was ordered into port in San Diego and shortly after departed for Peal Harbor, then the north Pacific on a special patrol, submerging on 21 December 1956 and resurfacing on 21 January 1957 before stopping in Yokosuka Japan.

In July 1970, a Survey Board found Segundo unfit for further naval service. The submarine was decommissioned 1 August 1970, struck from the Navy list on 8 August 1970, and sunk as a target by either the submarine  or the submarine  (sources differ).

Honors and awards
Segundo received four battle stars for World War II service and one for the Korean War.

References

Citations

Bibliography
 Hinman, Charles R., and Douglas E. Campbell. The Submarine Has No Friends: Friendly Fire Incidents Involving U.S. Submarines During World War II. Syneca Research Group, Inc., 2019. .

External links 
 

1944 ships
Balao-class submarines
Cold War submarines of the United States
Korean War submarines of the United States
Friendly fire incidents of World War II
Maritime incidents in September 1944
Maritime incidents in 1970
Ships built in Kittery, Maine
Ships sunk as targets
World War II submarines of the United States